Juzaqdan (also Romanized as Jūzaqdān; also known as Jūzkhadūn) is a village in Bala Deh Rural District, Beyram District, Larestan County, Fars Province, Iran. At the 2006 census, its population was 367, in 87 families.

References 

Populated places in Larestan County